Sibiraea is a genus of flowering plants of the family Rosaceae, disjunctly found in the Balkans, Central Asia, and China. The type species is Sibiraea laevigata, which is occasionally cultivated as an ornamental garden plant.

Species 
Some authorities feel that there are insufficient differences between the described species, and that they should all be collapsed into Sibiraea laevigata. Species currently accepted by The Plant List, are as follows: 
Sibiraea angustata (Rehder) Hand.-Mazz.
Sibiraea glaberrima K.S.Hao
Sibiraea laevigata (L.) Maxim.
Sibiraea tianschanica (Krasn.) Pojark.
Sibiraea tomentosa Diels

References 

Rosaceae genera
Spiraeeae